Uluberia Lok Sabha constituency is one of the 543 parliamentary constituencies in India. The constituency centres on Uluberia in West Bengal. All the seven assembly segments of No. 26 Uluberia Lok Sabha constituency are in Howrah district.

Assembly segments

As per order of the Delimitation Commission issued in 2006 in respect of the delimitation of constituencies in the West Bengal, parliamentary constituency no. 26 Uluberia is composed of the following segments:

Members of Parliament

Election results

General election 2019
Source:Source

By election 2018

General election 2014

General election 2009

General election 2004

General elections 1951-2004
Most of the contests were multi-cornered. However, only winners and runners-up are mentioned below:

See also
 List of Constituencies of the Lok Sabha

References

External links
Uluberia lok sabha  constituency election 2019 result details

Lok Sabha constituencies in West Bengal
Politics of Howrah district
1951 establishments in West Bengal
Constituencies established in 1951